is a Japanese tennis player.

Hosogi has a career-high WTA singles ranking of 204, achieved on 27 February 2023, and a career-high WTA doubles ranking of 370, achieved on 31 October 2022.

ITF Circuit finals

Singles: 11 (5 titles, 6 runner–ups)

Doubles: 2 (2 titles)

References

External links
 
 

2000 births
Living people
Japanese female tennis players
21st-century Japanese women